

T 

 
 
 84882 Table Mountain
 721 Tabora
 
 
 
 
 
 
 
 
 
 
 
 
 
 
 
 
 
 
 
 
 
 
 
 
 
 
 
 
 
 
 
 
 
 
 
 
 
 
 
 
 
 
 
 2169 Taiwan
 
 
 
 
 
 
 
 
 
 
 
 
 
 
 
 
 
 
 
 
 
 
 
 
 
 
 
 
 
 
 
 
 
 
 
 
 
 
 
 
 
 
 
 
 
 
 
 
 7776 Takeishi
 
 
 
 
 
 
 
 
 
 
 
 
 
 
 
 
 
 
 
 
 4672 Takuboku
 
 
 
 
 
 
 
 
 
 
 
 
 
 
 
 
 
 
 5786 Talos
 3564 Talthybius
 
 1089 Tama
 
 
 
 
 326 Tamara
 
 1084 Tamariwa
 
 
 
 
 
 
 
 
 
 
 
 
 
 2052 Tamriko
 
 
 
 
 
 
 
 
 
 
 
 
 
 
 
 
 
 
 
 5088 Tancredi
 
 
 
 772 Tanete
 
 
 
 
 
 
 
 
 
 
 
 
 
 
 
 
 825 Tanina
 
 
 
 
 
 
 
 
 
 
 2102 Tantalus
 
 
 
 
 2127 Tanya
 
 
 
 
 
 
 
 
 
 
 
 
 
 
 
 
 5370 Taranis
 
 
 
 2995 Taratuta
 
 3325 TARDIS
 
 
 
 
 3345 Tarkovskij
 
 
 
 
 
 
 
 
 
 
 
 
 
 
 
 
 
 
 
 
 
 
 
 
 
 
 1109 Tata
 
 
 
 
 
 
 
 4786 Tatianina
 
 769 Tatjana
 
 
 
 1989 Tatry
 
 
 
 
 
 
 
 
 581 Tauntonia
 
 512 Taurinensis
 814 Tauris
 
 
 
 
 
 
 
 
 
 
 
 
 
 
 
 4440 Tchantchès
 453 Tea
 
 
 
 
 
 
 
 
 
 2882 Tedesco
 
 
 
 88611 Teharonhiawako
 
 
 
 
 
 604 Tekmessa
 1749 Telamon
 
 
 
 
 
 5264 Telephus
 
 
 
 
 
 
 
 
 
 
 
 
 
 
 
 
 
 
 
 
 2195 Tengström
 
 
 
 
 
 
 
 
 
 
 
 
 
 
 
 
 
 
 
 
 
 
 
 345 Tercidina
 
 1189 Terentia
 
 
 
 
 
 
 
 
 
 
 
 
 
 478 Tergeste
 
 
 
 
 
 
 81 Terpsichore
 
 
 79912 Terrell
 
 
 
 
 
 
 
 
 
 
 
 
 
 
 
 
 
 
 
 
 
 
 2244 Tesla
 
 
 
 15374 Teta
 
 
 
 
 
 
 
 
 
 2797 Teucer
 
 1044 Teutonia
 
 
 
 
 
 
 1980 Tezcatlipoca
 
 
 
 1236 Thaïs
 
 
 23 Thalia
 
 
 
 
 
 
 
 
 
 1625 The NORC
 
 
 
 
 586 Thekla
 
 
 
 24 Themis
 778 Theobalda
 440 Theodora
 
 
 
 
 5041 Theotes
 
 
 
 
 295 Theresia
 32532 Thereus
 1545 Thernöe
 
 11509 Thersilochos
 1868 Thersites
 1161 Thessalia
 4902 Thessandrus
 4035 Thestor
 17 Thetis
 45300 Thewrewk
 405 Thia
 
 
 
 
 
 
 
 
 88 Thisbe
 
 4834 Thoas
 3255 Tholen
 
 1023 Thomana
 
 
 
 
 
 
 
 
 
 
 
 
 
 
 
 
 
 
 
 
 
 
 
 
 
 
 
 2064 Thomsen
 
 
 34746 Thoon
 299 Thora
 
 
 
 6257 Thorvaldsen
 
 
 
 
 3801 Thrasymedes
 9799 Thronium
 
 
 279 Thule
 
 
 
 
 10244 Thüringer Wald
 934 Thüringia
 
 219 Thusnelda
 
 
 
 115 Thyra
 
 
 
 
 
 
 
 
 
 4349 Tibúrcio
 
 
 
 
 
 
 
 
 
 
 
 
 
 
 753 Tiflis
 
 
 
 
 
 
 
 1229 Tilia
 
 
 
 
 
 
 603 Timandra
 
 
 
 
 
 
 
 
 6398 Timhunter
 
 
 
 
 
 
 
 
 
 
 
 
 
 
 
 
 
 
 
 
 
 1222 Tina
 
 
 
 
 1933 Tinchen
 687 Tinette
 
 
 
 
 
 
 
 
 
 
 1400 Tirela
 
 
 
 267 Tirza
 
 
 466 Tisiphone
 
 
 593 Titania
 
 
 
 1801 Titicaca
 1998 Titius
 1550 Tito
 
 
 
 
 
 9905 Tiziano
 
 
 732 Tjilaki
 
 
 
 
 
 
 
 
 
 
 
 
 
 18880 Toddblumberg
 
 
 
 
 
 
 
 
 
 2478 Tokai
 
 
 
 
 
 
 498 Tokio
 
 
 
 
 
 
 
 
 
 
 
 
 
 
 2675 Tolkien
 
 138 Tolosa
 
 
 
 
 
 
 
 
 
 
 
 1604 Tombaugh
 1013 Tombecka
 
 7648 Tomboles
 
 
 
 
 
 2443 Tomeileen
 
 4897 Tomhamilton
 
 
 
 
 
 
 2391 Tomita
 
 
 
 
 
 
 
 
 
 
 
 
 
 
 
 
 
 
 
 
 
 
 
 
 
 
 
 
 
 
 
 
 
 590 Tomyris
 
 1266 Tone
 
 
 
 
 
 
 
 924 Toni
 
 
 
 
 
 
 
 
 
 
 
 
 
 
 
 
 
 
 
 
 
 
 
 
 
 
 
 
 
 
 
 1685 Toro
 
 2104 Toronto
 
 
 
 
 
 
 
 
 12999 Toruń
 
 
 
 
 
 
 
 
 
 
 
 
 
 
 
 
 
 
 
 
 
 
 
 
 
 
 
 
 
 
 
 
 
 
 
 
 
 
 4179 Toutatis
 
 
 
 
 
 
 
 
 
 
 
 
 
 
 
 
 
 
 
 
 
 
 
 
 
 
 
 
 
 
 
 
 
 715 Transvaalia
 1537 Transylvania
 
 
 
 
 
 
 
 
 
 
 
 
 
 
 
 
 
 
 
 
 
 
 
 
 
 
 
 
 
 
 
 
 
 
 619 Triberga
 
 
 
 
 
 
 
 
 
 
 
 
 
 
 
 
 
 
 
 
 2037 Tripaxeptalis
 
 
 
 
 
 
 
 
 1208 Troilus
 
 
 
 
 
 
 
 
 
 
 
 
 
 
 
 
 
 
 
 
 
 
 
 
 
 
 
 
 
 2111 Tselina
 
 
 
 
 
 
 
 
 1590 Tsiolkovskaja
 
 
 
 
 
 
 
 
 
 
 
 
 
 
 
 
 
 
 
 
 
 
 
 
 
 
 
 
 
 
 
 
 
 
 
 
 
 
 
 
 
 
 
 
 1481 Tübingia
 
 2013 Tucapel
 
 
 
 1038 Tuckia
 
 
 1323 Tugela
 
 
 
 
 1095 Tulipa
 
 
 
 
 
 1070 Tunica
 
 
 1425 Tuorla
 
 530 Turandot
 
 
 
 
 
 
 1496 Turku
 
 1186 Turnera
 
 
 
 
 
 
 6229 Tursachan
 
 
 
 
 
 
 
 
 
 
 
 
 
 
 
 
 
 
 
 
 
 
 
 
 
 
 258 Tyche
 1677 Tycho Brahe
 
 
 
 
 
 
 
 
 
 
 
 
 1055 Tynka
 42355 Typhon
 
 9951 Tyrannosaurus
 13123 Tyson
 
 2120 Tyumenia

See also 
 List of minor planet discoverers
 List of observatory codes

References 
 

Lists of minor planets by name